Herbert Böcher (22 February 1903 – 14 January 1983) was a German middle-distance runner. He competed in the men's 1500 metres at the 1928 Summer Olympics.

References

1903 births
1983 deaths
Athletes (track and field) at the 1928 Summer Olympics
German male middle-distance runners
Olympic athletes of Germany
Place of birth missing